John Wych (fl. 1384–1393) of Hereford was an English politician.

Family
He was married and had two sons.

Career
He was a Member (MP) of the Parliament of England for Hereford in November 1384, 1385, 1386, January 1390 and 1393.

References

Year of birth missing
Year of death missing
English MPs November 1384
People from Hereford
English MPs 1385
English MPs 1386
English MPs January 1380
English MPs 1393